Thomas Coyne (12 October 1873 – 8 April 1955) was an Australian cricketer. He played four first-class matches for Western Australia between 1905/06 and 1908/09.

See also
 List of Western Australia first-class cricketers

References

External links
 

1873 births
1955 deaths
Australian cricketers
Western Australia cricketers
Cricketers from Adelaide